Chuzang Monastery (whole name: Chuzang Gön Ganden Mingyur Ling;) is a Tibetan Buddhist monastery of Gelug sect in the Huzhu County of Qinghai province, China. Monastery was founded in 1649 during the reign of the Khoshut Mongols inside the Khoshut Khanate (1642 – 1717). In the 1950s it had about 150 monks. During Cultural revolution was mostly destroyed and now being recovered.

Chuzang is one of 4 famous Tibetan monasteries (Chuzang, Serkhog, Jakhyung and Gonlung) in north-east Qinghai, area  .

References

Buddhist temples in Haidong
Gelug monasteries and temples
Major National Historical and Cultural Sites in Qinghai